That Guy... Who Was in That Thing is a 2012 documentary film by Ian Roumain and Michael Schwartz that features sixteen male character actors discussing their careers as working actors below the film star level but who are often recognized as being "that guy" who was in "that thing". Two talent agents also comment on the challenges faced by such actors.

The film was produced by Roumain, Schwartz and Brian Volk-Weiss for New Wave Entertainment. Doug Shanaberger described it as a "wonderful new documentary", saying: "If you're wondering who they are, that's half the point. But you'll recognize them, and that's the other half."

A sequel, That Gal...Who Was In That Thing: That Guy 2, focused on similarly lesser-known but familiar character actresses, including Catherine Hicks, Alicia Coppola and Roxanne Hart, was released on Showtime in March 2015.

Featured actors 
 Željko Ivanek
 Xander Berkeley
 Craig Fairbrass
 Bruce Davison
 Timothy Omundson
 Mark Rolston
 Wade Williams
 J. C. MacKenzie
 Robert Joy
 Stanley Kamel (who died after filming was completed)
 Rick Worthy
 Paul Guilfoyle
 Gregory Itzin
 W. Morgan Sheppard
 Zach Grenier
 Matt Malloy

References

External links

Documentary films about actors
Documentary films about the film industry
2012 television films
2012 films
American documentary television films
2010s English-language films
2010s American films